

Premise
A twelve-year-old girl with boundless optimism and a unique view of the world is inspired by the strange new boy at school and sets out to mend her broken family – whatever it takes.

Cast
 Daisy Axon as Candice Phee
 Wesley Patten as Douglas Benson
 Richard Roxburgh as Jim Phee
 Emma Booth as Claire Phee
 Miriam Margolyes as Miss Bamford
 Joel Jackson as Rich Uncle Brian
 Deborah Mailman as Penelope Benson

Production
The script is based on the Australian young adult novel My Life as an Alphabet, by Barry Jonsberg, with the screenplay written by Lisa Hoppe.

The film was shot in Albany, Western Australia from 12 November 2018 to 21 December 2018.

Release
The film premiered at the Melbourne International Film Festival, where it won second place in the audience awards, and also screened at the Perth Festival. It was distributed by R & R Films for Universal Pictures.

Reception
The site's critical consensus reads, "A feel-good family film that's as visually vibrant as its sunny outlook, H Is for Happiness finds a universal message in its young protagonist's journey".

Alissa Simon of Variety said that the film, "Provides feel-good entertainment for the entire family without pandering – and definitely without sacrificing style or substance".
David Stratton wrote, "What could have been trite and mawkish turns out to be really rather engaging".

Dov Kornits of Filmink called the film, "incredibly generous hearted, embracing the rich, the poor, the normal, the damaged, the eccentric, the humanity in equal measure".

Andrew F. Peirce of The Curb said, "I can say with complete certainty that I have not smiled this hard after a film in a very long time."

Conversely, Paul Byrnes of the Sydney Morning Herald argued, "Sheedy never finds the right tone for this ambitious project. Candice's florid language is great on paper, one of the main attractions of the book, but it's almost impossible to translate to the screen."

Leigh Paatsch of the Herald Sun said, "Some nice work does continually surface during H is for Happiness, but so too do its niggling inconsistencies. A less-is-more approach might have been the better way to go."

Box office

References

External links
  H is for Happiness at Screen Australia
  

2019 films
Australian comedy-drama films
Films set in Western Australia
Films set in the 21st century
2010s English-language films
Screen Australia films